The British Land Company plc is one of the largest property development and investment companies in the United Kingdom.  The firm became a real estate investment trust when REITs were introduced in the UK in January 2007.  It is headquartered in London, England.  It is listed on the London Stock Exchange and is a constituent of the FTSE 100 Index and a founding member of the European Public Real Estate Association.

History

The British Land Company was founded in 1856 as an offshoot of the National Freehold Land Society (later Abbey National) formed in 1849 with the two chief architects of the freehold land movement Richard Cobden and John Bright. Both were ardent supporters of a movement to extend enfranchisement. To qualify for a parliamentary vote it was then necessary to be a landowner and the main object of the National Freehold was to facilitate the acquisition of small plots of land by the people. To do this the British Land Co. would purchase land and then resell it on the best terms to any customer who wanted to buy it. With the extension of the franchise, this reason ceased to govern the operation of the company, and it began to operate as a normal business in the latter part of the nineteenth century.

In 2004 it received planning permission for a Richard Rogers designed skyscraper at 122 Leadenhall Street, known informally as "The Cheese Grater" in the City of London. Construction of the tower, which is the 6th tallest building in the United Kingdom, began in October 2007 and was completed in 2014.

In May 2005 British Land announced that it had agreed to purchase Pillar Property Plc for £811 million in cash to boost its position in the out-of-town retail property sector.

In 2006 Sir John Ritblat, who had chaired the company since 1970, stood down and was replaced by Chris Gibson-Smith.

In March 2019, the company appointed Tim Score as the chair of its board.

In September 2020, British Land announced that its chief executive Chris Grigg would exit the company December of that year. He was succeeded by the firms chief financial officer Simon Carter in November 2020.

In November 2020, British Land wrote down the value of its portfolio by almost £1bn after retail income fell due to the COVID-19 pandemic in the United Kingdom.

Operations

As of 31 March 2022 the company owned a portfolio valued at £7.0 billion. The portfolio includes the Meadowhall shopping centre in Sheffield, which is one of the largest in the UK, and a large amount of property which has been purchased from and leased back to major retailers such as Tesco, Sainsbury's, House of Fraser and Asda. This includes the Broadgate Estate, one of the largest developments in London over several decades, and Regent's Place near Warren Street Station.

In October 2011, the company placed in the number one position, with 135 subsidiaries, on a list of FTSE 100 companies that use tax havens for their operations, as revealed in a database of their subsidiaries compiled for the first time by the development charity ActionAid.

Main projects
 122 Leadenhall Street, London, opened in July 2014
 5 Broadgate, London
 4 Kingdom Street, Paddington, London
 Norton Folgate and Blossom Street, London
 Surrey Quays Shopping Centre, London
 Harmsworth Quays, London
 Stephen's Green Shopping Centre, Dublin, opened in 1988

References

External links

 
Property companies of the United Kingdom
Real estate investment trusts of the United Kingdom
Companies based in the City of Westminster
British companies established in 1856
1856 establishments in England
Companies listed on the London Stock Exchange